C11H17N2O2S Na may refer to:
 C11H17N2O2SNa, the molecular formula of sodium thiopental
 "C11H17N2O2S Na", a song by Anthrax on the album Sound of White Noise